Hélène Lenoir (born 1955, in Neuilly sur Seine) is a French writer. She has lived in Germany since 1980, where she teaches French.

Selected works
 La Brisure, novellas (Minuit, 1994, "double" no. 23, 2003). 
 Bourrasque, novel (Minuit, 1995). 
 Elle va partir, novel (Minuit, 1996). 
 Son nom d'avant, novel (Minuit, 1998, "double" no. 16, 2001). 
 Le Magot de Momm, novel (Minuit, 2001). 
 Le Répit, novel (Minuit, 2003). 
 L'Entracte, novellas (Minuit, 2005). 
 La Folie Silaz, novel (Minuit, 2008).
 Pièce rapportée, novel (Minuit, 2011).
 La Crue de juillet, novel (Minuit, 2013).
 Tilleul (Grasset, 2015).

References

French women novelists
French expatriates in Germany
People from Neuilly-sur-Seine
20th-century French novelists
20th-century French women writers
21st-century French novelists
21st-century French women writers
1955 births
Living people